Ekatmata Express is an intercity train of the Indian Railways connecting Pt. It is currently being operated with 14259/14260 train numbers on a weekly basis.

Service

The 14259/Ekatmata Express has an average speed of 48 km/hr and covers 319 km in 6 hrs 40 mins. 14260/Ekatmata Express has an average speed of 46 km/hr and covers 319 km in 7 hrs.

Route and halts 

 
 
 Bhadohi
 Janghai Junction

Coach composition

The train consists of 13 coaches :

 1 AC II Tier
 1 AC III Tier
 6 Sleeper coaches
 6 General
 2 Second-class Luggage/parcel van

Traction

Both trains are hauled by a Mughalsarai Loco Shed-based WDM-3A diesel locomotive.

External links 

 14259/Ekatmata Express
 14260/Ekatmata Express

References 

Passenger trains originating from Lucknow
Transport in Mughalsarai
Named passenger trains of India
Railway services introduced in 2016
Express trains in India